"Never Love You Enough" is a song recorded by American country music artist Chely Wright.  It was released in June 2001 as the first single and title track from the album Never Love You Enough.  The song reached #26 on the Billboard Hot Country Singles & Tracks chart.  The song was written by Brett James and Angelo Petraglia.

Chart performance

References

2001 singles
2001 songs
Chely Wright songs
Songs written by Brett James
Songs written by Angelo Petraglia
MCA Nashville Records singles